The 2019–20 Liga TDP season is the fourth-tier football league of Mexico. The tournament began on 6 September 2019 and will finish in Summer 2020. On April 7, 2020, the regular season was suspended due to COVID-19 pandemic. On 22 May 2020, the 2019–20 season was officially cancelled due to the pandemic affecting the country and no champion was crowned and no team was promoted to Liga Premier de México.

Competition format 
The Tercera División (Third Division) is divided into 13 groups. For the 2009/2010 season, the format of the tournament has been reorganized to a home and away format, which all teams will play in their respective group. The 13 groups consist of teams who are eligible to play in the liguilla de ascenso for one promotion spot, teams who are affiliated with teams in the Liga MX, Ascenso MX and Liga Premier, which are not eligible for promotion but will play that who the better filial team in an eight team filial playoff tournament for the entire season.

The league format allows participating franchises to rent their place to another team, so some clubs compete with a different name than the one registered with the FMF.

Group 1 
Group with 15 teams from Campeche, Chiapas, Quintana Roo, Tabasco and Yucatán.

Teams

League table

Group 2 
Group with 18 teams from Puebla and Veracruz.
Note: Albinegros de Orizaba (disaffiliated on December 18, 2019; will not participate in Clausura 2020)

Teams

League table

Group 3 
Group with 12 teams from Chiapas, Oaxaca and Veracruz.

Teams

League table

Group 4 
Group with 18 teams from Mexico City and Greater Mexico City.

Teams

League table

Group 5 

Group with 15 teams from Mexico City and State of Mexico.

Teams

League table

Group 6 
Group with 11 teams from Guerrero, Mexico City, Morelos, Puebla and State of Mexico.

Teams

League table

Group 7 
Group with 16 teams from Hidalgo, Mexico City, Puebla and State of Mexico.

Teams

League table

Group 8 
Group with 15 teams from Guanajuato, Michoacán and Querétaro.

Teams

League table

Group 9 
Group with 9 teams from Durango, Guanajuato, Jalisco and Zacatecas.

Teams

League table

Group 10 
Group with 20 teams from Colima and Jalisco. Note: Loros UdeC (dissolved on December 27, 2019; will not participate in Clausura 2020) for that reason, Atlético Manzanillo was relocated in Colima City and renamed as Real Colima.

Teams
{{Location map+ |Mexico Jalisco |width=500|float=right |caption=Location of teams in the 2019–20 Liga TDP Group 10 |places=

League table

Group 11 
Group with 17 teams from Jalisco, Nayarit and Sinaloa.

Teams
{{Location map+ |Mexico Jalisco |width=500|float=right |caption=Location of teams in the 2019–20 Liga TDP Group 11 (Jalisco and Nayarit)|places=

League table

Group 12 
Group with 14 teams from Coahuila, Nuevo León and Tamaulipas.

Teams

League table

Group 13 
Group with 7 teams from Chihuahua and Sonora.

Teams

League table

Group 14 
Group with 7 teams from Baja California.

Teams

League table

Reserve Teams 
Each season a table is created among those teams that don't have the right to promote, because they are considered as reserve teams for teams that play in Liga MX, Ascenso MX and Liga Premier. The ranking order is determined through the "quotient", which is obtained by dividing the points obtained between the disputed matches, being ordered from highest to lowest.

Table 

Last updated: March 16, 2020 Source: Liga TDPP = Position; G = Games played; Pts = Points; Pts/G = Ratio of points to games played; GD = Goal difference

Regular Season statistics

Top goalscorers 
Players sorted first by goals scored, then by last name.

Last updated on March 16, 2020.Source: LigaTDP

See also 
Liga TDP

References

External links 
 Official website of Liga TDP

Mx
1